Live at the Empire Pool is a recording of live concert by the progressive rock band, Pink Floyd, recorded by BBC Radio 1. The record has not been released as a standalone album but has been released in parts as part of other Pink Floyd releases; namely the Dark Side of the Moon and Wish You Were Here immersion box sets (2011) and The Early Years 1965-1972 box set (2016). The album was recorded during the British Winter Tour, 1974 at the Empire Pool (now Wembley Arena), Wembley, England. The shows are notable for showcasing an early version of "Shine On You Crazy Diamond" as well as very early versions of "Sheep" and "Dogs" under different titles – "Raving and Drooling" and "You've Got to Be Crazy", respectively. The tour also featured the whole of The Dark Side of the Moon album played as well as one of the final performances of "Echoes" before being resurrected briefly in 1987; this performance of "Echoes" is notable for featuring saxophone performed by Dick Parry.

The show was recorded by the BBC and broadcast on BBC Radio 1 (Dark Side set only), on 11 January 1975 as part of Alan Freeman's programme.

The tracks on the Wish You Were Here Immersion box set were recorded on 15 November 1974. The tracks from "Speak To Me" to "The Great Gig in the Sky" were recorded on 16 November 1974, while the tracks from "Money" to "Eclipse" were recorded on 15 November 1974, with patches from the 16th. "Echoes" was recorded on 16 November 1974. 

The first three tracks were released as part of the Wish You Were Here Immersion box set in November 2011. The whole performance of Dark Side of the Moon was released two months earlier, in September 2011 as part of the Dark Side... Immersion box set. The encore, "Echoes", was not released until November 2016 when it was included in The Early Years 1965–1972 box set as part of Volume 7: 1967–1972 Continu/ation.

On 24 March 2023 the performance of The Dark Side of the Moon only will feature as part of the album's 50th anniversary box set on CD and vinyl, newly remastered; and will also be released as a standalone album on CD and vinyl with the title The Dark Side of the Moon Live at Wembley 1974 - these will mark its first availability on vinyl. "Shine On You Crazy Diamond", "You've Got to Be Crazy", "Raving and Drooling", and "Echoes" are still exclusive to their previously mentioned box set releases.

Track listing
The full album list is as follows:

The following tracks can be found in the Experience 2-CD and Immersion box set editions of Wish You Were Here (2011):
 "Shine On You Crazy Diamond" (early version)
 "Raving and Drooling" (early version of "Sheep")
 "You've Got to Be Crazy" (early version of "Dogs")
The following tracks can be found in the Experience 2-CD and Immersion box set editions of The Dark Side of the Moon (2011); in The Dark Side of the Moon 50th Anniversary box set (2023) and on the standalone album The Dark Side of the Moon Live at Wembley 1974 (2023):
 "Speak to Me" (extended tape)
 "Breathe"
 "On the Run"
 "Time"
 "The Great Gig in the Sky"
 "Money"
 "Us and Them"
 "Any Colour You Like"
 "Brain Damage"
 "Eclipse"
The following track can be found in Volume 7: 1967–1972 Continu/ation of The Early Years 1965–1972 box set (2016):
 "Echoes"

Personnel
Pink Floyd

 David Gilmour – guitars, vocals, organ on "The Great Gig in the Sky"
 Roger Waters – bass, vocals
 Richard Wright – keyboards, vocals, Azimuth Co-ordinator
 Nick Mason – drums, percussion

with

 Dick Parry – saxophones
 The Blackberries
 Vanetta Fields – backing vocals
 Carlena Williams – backing vocals

References

he:The Dark Side of the Moon

2011 live albums
Pink Floyd live albums